Richard James Bragnalo (born December 1, 1951) is a Canadian retired ice hockey centre.

Bragnalo was born in Fort William, Ontario. After playing college hockey at the University of Denver, Bragnalo was signed by the Washington Capitals as a free agent in 1976. Bragnalo played parts of four seasons for the Capitals. After playing a few years in the minors, Bragnalo moved on to playing hockey in Italy with Val Pusteria Wolves, former EV Brunico, and with his Italian heritage, he was able to play for Italy on several occasions including at the A Pool of the 1982 World Ice Hockey Championships and 1983 World Ice Hockey Championships. He signed for HC Milano Saima in 1990, scoring the goal that permitted Milano to win the league in 1990/91. He retired in 1992.

Career statistics

External links

 Val Pusteria Wolves

1951 births
Living people
Brunico SG players
Canadian ice hockey centres
Canadian sportspeople of Italian descent
Dayton Gems players
Denver Pioneers men's ice hockey players
HC Pustertal Wölfe players
HC Milano Saima players
Hershey Bears players
Ice hockey people from Ontario
Italian ice hockey players
Port Huron Flags (IHL) players
Sportspeople from Thunder Bay
Undrafted National Hockey League players
Washington Capitals players
Canadian expatriate ice hockey players in Italy